Roy David Selleck (15 August 1909 – 19 October 1972) was an Australian rules footballer who played for the South Melbourne Football Club in the Victorian Football League (VFL)

Selleck played with Camberwell Football Club in the Victorian Football Association from 1935 to 1937.

References

External links 

Roy Selleck's playing statistics from The VFA Project

1909 births
1972 deaths
Australian rules footballers from Melbourne
Sydney Swans players
Camberwell Football Club players
People from South Melbourne